El Portezuelo is a village and municipality in Catamarca Province in northwestern Argentina. 

El puertezuelo has 4 Neighborhoods

La Quebrada ,El Carril , Arturo Illia,Hermana Jacinta Rodriguez.

The bridge on the river Paclín divide  la Quebrada y Carril

References

Populated places in Catamarca Province